{{DISPLAYTITLE:C8H8O3}}
The molecular formula C8H8O3 (molar mass: 152.15 g/mol) may refer to:

 Anisic acids
 o-Anisic acid (2-methoxybenzoic acid)
 m-Anisic acid (3-methoxybenzoic acid)
 p-Anisic acid (4-methoxybenzoic acid)
 3,4-Dihydroxyphenylacetaldehyde
 2-Hydroxy-4-methoxybenzaldehyde
 2-Hydroxy-5-methoxybenzaldehyde
 4-Hydroxyphenylacetic acid
 Isovanillin
 Mandelic acid
 Methylparaben
 Methyl salicylate
 Methylsalicylic acids
 3-Methylsalicylic acid
 4-Methylsalicylic acid
 5-Methylsalicylic acid
 6-Methylsalicylic acid
 Tetrahydrophthalic anhydride
 Vanillin
 o-Vanillin